Ludmila Vachtová (24 September 1933 – 23 July 2020) was a Czech art historian, art critic, curator and translator. In the 1960s, she curated the Gallery on Charles Square and the Platýz Gallery. She lived in Switzerland since 1972. She also published books on the history of art and the lives of specific artists, including Frank Kupka, Pioneer of Abstract Art in 1968.

Vachtová died in Zürich on July 23, 2020 at the age of 86.

References

1933 births
2020 deaths
Czech art historians
Czech art critics
Czech curators
Czech translators
Czech women curators
Czech women historians
European art curators
Women art critics
Czechoslovak emigrants to Switzerland
People from Beroun